"Naked in the Rain" is a song performed by English dance music group Blue Pearl and released as their debut single in 1990. The song was co-written by Blue Pearl's singer Durga McBroom and producer Youth (also known as Martin Glover). It is featured on their album Naked. Graham Massey from English electronic music group 808 State was the track's remixer.

The song was a hit in the United Kingdom, reaching number four on the UK Singles Chart in July 1990, and later became a dance hit in the United States, reaching the top five on the Billboard Hot Dance Club Play chart. A music video, directed by Richard Stanley, accompanied the song on its release, featuring McBroom performing in a tropical jungle-like scene mixed with scenes in an almost Third World setting, and visualizes the overall atmosphere of the song.

In 1998 the song was remixed and released as a single. Entitled "Naked in the Rain '98", the remixed version reached number 22 on the UK Singles Chart.

Charts

Weekly charts
"Naked in the Rain"

"Naked in the Rain '98"

Year-end charts

Other versions
 The Naturists, a techno band led by Sid Raven and Wilmott Doonican, issued a version called "Naked" on Interactive records in 1994

References

1990 debut singles
1990 songs
Big Life Records singles
Songs written by Youth (musician)